Kiekko-Espoo Naiset are an ice hockey team in the Naisten Liiga. The team was founded as Espoon Kiekkoseura (EKS) in 1989 and has also been known as Espoo Blues Naiset and Espoo United Naiset during its tenure in the Naisten Liiga. Kiekko-Espoo have won the Aurora Borealis Cup as the Finnish Champions in women's ice hockey sixteen times, six more wins than any other team in league history; at least one Finnish Championship medal (gold, silver, or bronze) was won under each of the four names.

The parent club, Kiekko-Espoo Oy, also has a representative men's ice hockey team in the Mestis, a representative ringette team in the Ringeten SM-sarja, and active sections in minor and junior ice hockey and youth ringette.

History

EKS, 1990–1992 
The team entered Naisten SM-sarja (now Naisten Liiga) in the 1990–91 season under the name Espoon Kiekkoseura or EKS. The two seasons played as EKS were an impressive showing for the newcomers and each resulted in a bronze medal, one in the 1990–91 season after defeating Ässät and one in the 1991–92 season after defeating KalPa.

Several EKS players also played for the bronze medal winning Finnish women's national team at the 1992 IIHF World Championship including Liisa Karikoski, Katri-Helena Luomajoki, and Hanna Teerijoki.

Kiekko-Espoo, 1992–1998 
In 1992 EKS was renamed Kiekko-Espoo, the same name as its brother-team in the Liiga. The team continued to be held to bronze or lower finishes, making it to five bronze medal series in six years and winning four of them (1993, 1994, 1997, 1998).

The Golden Age: Espoo Blues, 1998–2016 
The team was renamed Espoo Blues in 1998, continuing the trend of sharing the name of its brother-team in the Liiga, which also renamed Espoo Blues in that year. The name change unwittingly marked the beginning of a "golden age" for the team. Starting with their first SM-sarja gold medal in 1999, after achieving victory over JYP Jyväskylä in the finals, they went on to win a staggering seven consecutive championships (1999–2005) and a total of thirteen championships in eighteen years. The Blues were kept off the SM-sarja medal podium only three times in the 1998–2016 span; in addition to their championship titles, they earned the team's first silver medal in 2009 and two more bronze medals in 2006 and 2016.

The Espoo Blues were also strong competitors at international tournaments in this period, earning medals at six IIHF European Women's Champions Cups: three silver medals (2005, 2007-08, 2009-10) and three bronze medals (2008-09, 2013–14, 2014–15).

Espoo United, 2016–17 
In March 2016 Jääkiekko Espoo Oy, the parent club of both the Espoo Blues of the Naisten Liiga and Espoo Blues of the Liiga, declared bankruptcy with estimated liabilities of approximately €3 million. In response, Jussi Salonoja, a Finnish millionaire and film director who had previously owned the Espoo Blues franchise from 2002–2012, created a new club and organization called Espoo United Oy, stating that he was "committed to supporting hockey in Espoo." The Espoo Blues men's and women's basketball and ice hockey teams would play for Espoo United.

For the 2016–17 season the Espoo United women's ice hockey team played in the Naisten SM-sarja and won silver in the 2017 Finnish Championship. The Espoo United men's team played in the Mestis, the league below the premier-level Liiga, where they won bronze in the playoffs.

On 15 August 2017 Salonoja announced that the Espoo United was abandoning its women's ice hockey and basketball teams for financial reasons. “The reason is twofold: the men's teams' budgets are far greater than those of women's teams, so their running is more demanding, but on the other hand, [the men's teams] are more interesting to sponsors and audiences,” Salonoja said.

The future of women's ice hockey team was left uncertain and many possible solutions were proposed, including being acquired by HIFK or merging with Espoo Blues Juniorit (a junior club with strong ties to the franchise).

Espoo Blues part 2, 2017–2019 
In September 2017 the Finnish Ice Hockey Association announced that it had supported the creation of an independent association, Ysikoppi ry, to oversee the team and had given its approval for the team to compete in the upcoming 2017–18 season under the name Espoo Blues.

Players and personnel

2022–23 roster 

Coaching staff and team personnel
 Head coach: Sami Haapanen
 Assistant coach: Johanna Leskinen
 Goaltending coach: Risto Jaakkola
 Conditioning coach: Viola Kaukonen
 Team managers: Jarko Malm & Matti Väyrynen
 Equipment manager: Marko Ahlroth

Team captaincy history 
 Katri-Helena Luomajoki, 1997–98
 Essi Sievers, 2007–2009
 Emma Terho, 2009–2011
 Essi Sievers, 2011–12
 Emma Terho, 2012–2014
 Minttu Tuominen, 2014–2016
 Linda Leppänen, 2016–17
 Minttu Tuominen, 2017–2020
 Annina Rajahuhta, 2020–21
 Minttu Tuominen, 2021–22
 Emmi Rakkolainen, 2022–

Head coaches 
 Johanna Ikonen, 1998–99
 Jari Kalho, 2000–01
 Hannu Saintula, 2001–02
 Jari Peltonen, 2002–2006
 Sami Haapanen, 2008–2011
 Kai Jansson, 2012–13
 Sami Haapanen, 2013–

Team honours

Finnish Championship 
  Aurora Borealis Cup (16): 1999, 2000, 2001, 2002, 2003, 2004, 2005, 2007, 2008, 2009, 2013, 2014, 2015, 2019, 2021, 2022
  Runners-up (2): 2010, 2017
  Third Place (8): 1991, 1992, 1993, 1994, 1997, 1998, 2006, 2016

IIHF European Women's Champions Cup

  Silver (3): 2005, 2007–08, 2009–10
  Bronze (3): 2008–09, 2013–14, 2014–15

Season-by-season results 
This is a partial list of the most recent seasons completed by the franchise. The team was called the “Espoo Blues” during the 2015–16, 2017–18, and 2018–19 seasons; “Espoo United”  in the 2016–17 season, and “Kiekko-Espoo” from the 2019–20 season on.

Note: Finish = Rank at end of regular season; GP = Games played; W = Wins (3 points); OTW = Overtime wins (2 points); OTL = Overtime losses (1 point); L = Losses (0 points); GF = Goals for; GA = Goals against; Pts = Points

Source(s): Finnish Ice Hockey Association

Franchise records and leaders

Single-season records
Most goals in a season: Karoliina Rantamäki, 39 goals (24 games; 2002–03)
Most assists in a season: Minttu Tuominen, 50 assists (30 games; 2018–19)
Most points in a season: Michelle Karvinen, 81 points (22 games; 2008–09)
Most points in a season, defenceman: Minttu Tuominen, 62 points (30 games; 2018–19)
Most penalty minutes in a season: Tea Villilä, 76 PIM (16 games; 2008–09)
Best save percentage in a season, over ten games played: Noora Räty, .954 SVS% (19 games; 2006–07) / Isabella Laiho, .954 SVS% (19 games; 2013–14)
Best goals against average in a season, over ten games played: Noora Räty, 1.21 GAA (19 games; 2006–07)

Career records 
Most career goals: Karoliina Rantamäki, 355 goals (338 games; 1992–2007)
Most career assists: Petra Vaarakallio, 351 assists (286 games; 1992–1994, 1995–2006)
Most career points: Karoliina Rantamäki, 639 points (338 games; 1992–2007)
Best career points per game, over 30 games played: Michelle Karvinen, 3.667 points per game (39 games; 2007–2009)
Most career points, defenceman: Minttu Tuominen, 313 points  (208 games; 2006–2009, 2013–2016, 2017–2020)
Most career penalty minutes: Tea Villilä, 353 penalty minutes (169 games; 2008–2010, 2016–2021)

All-time scoring leaders
The top-ten point-scorers in franchise history, 1982 through the conclusion of the 2021–22 season.

Note: Pos = Position; GP = Games played; G = Goals; A = Assists; Pts = Points; P/G = Points per game;  = 2022–23 Kiekko-Espoo player

Source(s): Elite Prospects

Notable alumnae 

Years active with Kiekko-Espoo listed alongside players' names.

 Kati Ahonen, 1996–1999
 Mira Huhta, 2013–2019
 Sanna Kanerva, 1998–2001
 Liisa Karikoski, 1990–1994
 Piia Kotikumpu, 2000–2009 & 2011–12
 Linda Leppänen, 2010–2017
 Pia Lund, 2006–2013
 Katri-Helena Luomajoki, 1990–1994 & 1995–2002
 Sari Marjamäki, 2003–2007
 Terhi Mertanen, 2001–02, 2008–2011, 2012–13 & 2014–15
 Emma Nuutinen, 2011–2016 & 2020–21
 Oona Parviainen, 1999–2010
 Annina Rajahuhta, 2008–09 & 2012–2021
 Karoliina Rantamäki, 1992–2007
 Tiia Reima, 2009–2011
 Meeri Räisänen, 2008–2011
 Noora Räty, 2005–2009
 Maria Saarni, 1994–2000
 Essi Sievers, 2002–2010 & 2011–2014
 Jenna Silvonen, 2015–2019
 Hanna Teerijoki, 1991–1994
 Emma Terho, 1996–2000, 2004–2007 & 2008–2015
 Noora Tulus, 2013–2016
 Satu Tuominen, 2001–2009
 Petra Vaarakallio, 1992–2006
 Päivi Virta (previously Halonen), 1997–2006
 Marjo Voutilainen, 2004–2008
 Heidi Wiik, 1999–2005

International players 
  Susanne Ceder, 1998–2000
  Minna Dunder, 1993–94
  Moeko Fujimoto, 2014–15
  Nikola Gápová, 2015–2018
  Sheila Gagnon, 2001–02 & 2008–09
  Jin Fengling, 2005–06
  Marianne Mattila, 1996–1998
  Danielle Rozon, 2017–18
  Sun Rui, 2005–06
  Arina Zvezdina, 2011–12

References

External links 
 Team information and statistics from Eliteprospects.com and Eurohockey.com and Hockeyarchives.info (in French)

Naisten Liiga (ice hockey) teams
Sport in Espoo
Kiekko-Espoo
1989 establishments in Finland